Chief Chisca Lake is a reservoir in the U.S. state of Mississippi.

Chisca  is a name derived from the Creek language meaning "base of a tree".

References

Reservoirs in Mississippi
Bodies of water of DeSoto County, Mississippi
Mississippi placenames of Native American origin